Jordan Hot Springs is series of thermal mineral springs located in the Golden Trout Wilderness, Inyo National Forest, California.

History
Prior to European contact, the hot springs and the surrounding areas were used by the local Indigenous people for centuries as a summer encampment area. In 1857, John Jordan, a Texan, and his family moved to Tulare County during the gold and silver rush. Later, in 1861 he blazed a trail to the hot springs and filed a petition to build a toll road, called the Jordan Trail. The following year he drowned in the Kern River while navigating a raft across the river. In the late 19th century a grouping of log cabins and a logging camp was built.

In 1992, Jordan Hot Springs received National Historic Landmark status.

Description
There are at least fourteen hot springs making up the Jordan Hot Springs system. Hot mineral water emerges from the springs at 120°F, and flows down to meet Nine Mile Creek where it cools and collects in a series of primitive rock-walled soaking pools of various temperatures. The average temperature of the water in the soaking pools is 104°F. The cooler soaking pools are 94°F. There is also a small, two-foot deep concrete-lined soaking pool.

The ruins of an abandoned early 20th century resort camp are nearby.

Location
The spring can be reached by way of a trail originating at the Blackrock Station, the trail descends 3,000 feet during the six mile hike to the springs; the moderately rigorous return hike ascends 3,000 feet. GPS coordinates: N 36 13.740 W 118 18.120. There are other hot springs in the area, Middle Fork Hot Springs (also known as Lightfeather Hot Springs) is 8 miles downstream, and Meadows Warm Springs are 4 miles upstream from Jordan Hot Springs.

See also
 List of hot springs in the United States
 List of hot springs in the world

References

Hot springs of California
Inyo National Forest